Mister Mellow is the third studio album by American singer Washed Out. It was released on June 30, 2017, and is his first project with Stones Throw Records. The CD release is accompanied by a visual album on DVD.

Track listing

Personnel
Credits adapted from the liner notes of Mister Mellow.

CD
 Ernest Greene – art direction, cover, production, recording, vocals
 Constant Artists – management
 Dave Cooley – mastering
 Alexandra Galvillet – inlay photo
 Jeff Jank – design, layout
 Cole M.G.N. – additional production, mixing, recording

DVD
 Ernest Greene – concept, music
 Bráulio Amado – credits, titles
 Jesse Orrall – film editing

Charts

References

2017 albums
Stones Throw Records albums
Washed Out albums
Albums produced by Cole M. Greif-Neill